Marine Police may refer to:

 Water police
 Cyprus Port and Marine Police
 Gujarat Marine Police 
 Marine Police (Hong Kong)
 Marine Police Force (aka Thames River Police)
 Vietnam Coast Guard 
 Virginia Marine Police

See also
 Royal Marines Police